Burnshill is a town in Amathole District Municipality in the Eastern Cape province of South Africa.

Former mission station of the Glasgow Missionary Society, established at the foot of the Amathole Mountains in 1831. Named after John Burns, minister of the Barony Church, Glasgow, one of the founders of the society. It was destroyed in 1851.

References

Populated places in the Amahlathi Local Municipality